Almah is the debut album of Almah, a solo project of Brazilian heavy metal singer and former Angra frontman Edu Falaschi. The lyrics are about the different feelings of the human being and the title phonetically means "soul" in the Portuguese language. It was released in 2006, with Falaschi touring to promote the album in Brazil along with former Symbols members Tito Falaschi (his brother) and Demian Tiguez.

Track listing
"King"
"Take Back Your Spell"
"Forgotten Land"
"Scary Zone"
"Children of Lies"
"Break All the Welds"
"Golden Empire"
"Primitive Chaos"
"Breathe"
"Box of Illusion"
"Almah"
"The Sign of Glory" (bonus)
"Supermind" (bonus)

Personnel
 Edu Falaschi (Angra) – vocals, guitar and keyboard
 Emppu Vuorinen (Nightwish) – guitar
 Lauri Porra (Stratovarius) – bass
 Casey Grillo (Kamelot) – drums

Guest musicians
 Mike Stone (Queensrÿche) – guitar
 Edu Ardanuy (Dr. Sin) – guitar
 Fábio Laguna (Angra) – keyboards

Live
 Edu Falaschi – vocals, guitar
 Edu Ardanuy – guitar
 Tito Falaschi – bass
 Adriano Daga – drums

Charts

References

External links
  Almah - official site

Almah (band) albums
2006 debut albums